
Gmina Zdzieszowice is an urban-rural gmina (administrative district) in Krapkowice County, Opole Voivodeship, in south-western Poland.

The gmina contains part of the protected area called Góra Świętej Anny Landscape Park.

Villages
Apart from the town of Zdzieszowice, Gmina Zdzieszowice contains the villages and settlements of Januszkowice, Jasiona, Krępna, Oleszka, Rozwadza, Wielmierzowice and Żyrowa.

Neighbouring gminas
Gmina Zdzieszowice is bordered by the town of Kędzierzyn-Koźle and by the gminas of Gogolin, Krapkowice, Leśnica, Reńska Wieś, Strzelce Opolskie and Walce.

Twin towns – sister cities

Gmina Zdzieszowice is twinned with:
 Lipník nad Bečvou, Czech Republic

References

Zdzieszowice
Krapkowice County